Pohangina is a small rural community in the Manawatū-Whanganui region of New Zealand, just north of Ashhurst.

Pohangina is located along the foot of the Ruahine Range, and is primarily farming land. Farming varies from sheep and cattle to crops of maize and 'chow'. The farmland was originally ancient native forest. Rimu and northern rātā grew above 1000 feet, with kamahi, kaikawaka and pink pine growing at higher and steeper slopes, leatherwood scrub growing at higher altitudes, and wild tussocks growing at the summits of the range.

The area still includes many conservation areas, including the Totara Reserve camping ground, the Pohangina River, Pohangina Wetlands reserve, and Pohangina Base, a former DOC field centre in the Ruahine Forest Park.

Pohangina includes a village, with several historical buildings, including a small chapel and at community hall built in 1933. The area is a fishing spot for brown trout and rainbow trout.

Pohangina translates as "ulcerated night", possibly suggesting the valley had been a place of bloodshed between the local Rangitāne Māori people and their enemies. However, the name is a corruption of the proper form, "Pou hangina", so is likely to reference posts or supports, metaphoric or physical.

Demographics

The population of Pohangina was 210 in the 2018 New Zealand census, an increase of 24 (12.9%) since the 2013 census, and an increase of 24 (12.9%) since the 2006 census. There were 105 males and 105 females, giving a sex ratio of 1.0 males per female. Ethnicities were 198 people  (94.3%) European/Pākehā, 21 (10.0%) Māori, 6 (2.9%) Pacific peoples, and 3 (1.4%) Asian (totals add to more than 100% since people could identify with multiple ethnicities). Of the total population, 42 people  (20.0%) were under 15 years old, 24 (11.4%) were 15–29, 117 (55.7%) were 30–64, and 30 (14.3%) were over 65.

Pohangina-Apiti

The Pohangina-Apiti statistical area, which also covers Āpiti, had a population of 1,227 at the 2018 New Zealand census, an increase of 132 people (12.1%) since the 2013 census, and an increase of 162 people (15.2%) since the 2006 census. There were 459 households. There were 618 males and 609 females, giving a sex ratio of 1.01 males per female. The median age was 43.2 years (compared with 37.4 years nationally), with 273 people (22.2%) aged under 15 years, 162 (13.2%) aged 15 to 29, 639 (52.1%) aged 30 to 64, and 153 (12.5%) aged 65 or older.

Ethnicities were 95.6% European/Pākehā, 7.8% Māori, 1.5% Pacific peoples, 0.5% Asian, and 2.4% other ethnicities (totals add to more than 100% since people could identify with multiple ethnicities).

The proportion of people born overseas was 14.4%, compared with 27.1% nationally.

Although some people objected to giving their religion, 59.2% had no religion, 28.9% were Christian, 0.2% were Buddhist and 2.7% had other religions.

Of those at least 15 years old, 258 (27.0%) people had a bachelor or higher degree, and 141 (14.8%) people had no formal qualifications. The median income was $36,800, compared with $31,800 nationally. The employment status of those at least 15 was that 558 (58.5%) people were employed full-time, 156 (16.4%) were part-time, and 15 (1.6%) were unemployed.

Education

References 

Manawatu District
Populated places in Manawatū-Whanganui